Copelatus tinctor is a species of diving beetle. It is part of the genus Copelatus in the subfamily Copelatinae of the family Dytiscidae.

References

tinctor
Beetles described in 1954